Traci Lind (born Traci Lin Wemes) is a retired American film actress who is known for playing Alex Young in Fright Night Part 2, Christie Langford in Class of 1999 and Missy McCloud in My Boyfriend's Back. She also starred in The Road to Wellville and The End of Violence. She was billed in Fright Night Part 2 and Spellcaster as Traci Lin.

She began modeling at age 13 after being discovered by Elite's head, John Casablancas. In 1997, Lind went public with accusations of abuse regarding former boyfriend Dodi Fayed, who later died in a car accident along with his new partner, Diana, Princess of Wales. Later that same year, she retired from acting, saying in a 2013 interview: "I am an intensely private person, so the whole acting thing was just the wrong path for me".

Filmography

Film

Television

References

External links

American film actresses
Living people
21st-century American women
Year of birth missing (living people)